is a rail line in Takaoka, Toyama, Japan. It is operated by Japan Freight Railway Company (JR Freight). It runs from Nōmachi Station to Takaoka Freight Terminal.

Route data 
Company: Japan Freight Railway Company (JR Freight) (Category-1) 
Distance: 1.9 km / 1.2 mi
Gauge: 1,067 mm / 3 ft 6 in
Stations: 2
Double-track line: None
Electric supply: Not electrified
Signalling: Simplified automatic

Stations

See also 
List of railway lines in Japan

Lines of Japan Railway companies
Rail transport in Toyama Prefecture